O'Neal Nunataks is a small, linear group of nunataks that mark the south end of Bastien Range, in the Ellsworth Mountains. Named by the University of Minnesota geological parties to the Ellsworth Mountains for Jerry O'Neal, aerographer with these parties in 1963-64 and 1964–65.

Nunataks of Ellsworth Land